Dinanukht (also spelled Dinanukt or Dananukt;  or ; from Persian 'the one who speaks in accordance with the religion') is a mythological character in the Ginza Rabba, one of the main religious scriptures of Mandaeism, who is portrayed as an anthropomorphic book. Book 6 of the Right Ginza describes his ascension to the World of Light.

Buckley (2010) suggests a connection with Nbu (Mercury), who is associated with scribes and books. For instance, in the Zrazta ḏ-Hibil Ziwa (Drower Collection Ms. 44), Nbu is the Lord of Book and ink and wisdom. Similarly, Dinanukht is called the "ink-book of the gods" in Right Ginza 6.

Spellings
Petermann spells the name as Dinanukt, while Lidzbarski spells it as Dinanukht. However, the Mhatam Yuhana Ginza from Ahvaz, Iran, which Gelbert (2011) is based on, spells it as Dananukt.

Story in the Ginza Rabba
Dinanukht, who is half-man, half-book, unsuccessfully tries to destroy Diṣai, another half-man, half-book, by burning and drowning when he is disturbed by his speech. However, Ewath (an epithet for Ruha) soon appears to repeat this speech, which is reminiscent of the Nag Hammadi Gnostic poem The Thunder, Perfect Mind. Torgny Säve-Söderbergh (1949) also noted similarities with Psalms of Thomas 14, in which Hylē provides an answer of co-existing opposites (e.g., "death and life").

Din Mlikh, an uthra, then leads Dinanukht past six different maṭartas (watch-houses) as he ascends to the World of Light:

the maṭarta of Nbaz-Haila
the maṭarta of Zan-Haza-Zban
the maṭarta of Ewath-Ruha (a compound name combining the epithet Ewath with its synonymous name Ruha)
the maṭarta of Himun
the maṭarta of Ptahil
the maṭarta of Abatur

Each time Dinanukht starts his ascension to one of the maṭartas, the text begins with the poetic refrain:

Dinanukht sees many wondrous things and then returns to earth, where his wife, Nuraita (also the name of Noah's wife in Book 18), thinks that he has become insane when Dinanukht tells her that he wants his books to be burned and drowned (see also divine madness). Dinanukht then proceeds to burn and drown the books himself. He continues to live on Tibil for 65 more years as he serves religious duties ordains priests. After Dinanukht's life on earth is over, he finally ascends to the World of Light.

See also
Nbu (Mercury), who is associated with scribes and books
Matarta
Utnapishtim

References

Mandaeism
Mythological characters
Angelic visionaries
Mythic humanoids